Eric Fowler (born October 17, 1984) is a former American football wide receiver who played for the Detroit Lions. He was signed by the Pittsburgh Steelers as an undrafted free agent in 2007. He played college football at Grand Valley State.

Fowler was also a member of the St. Louis Rams.

Early years
Fowler attended New Haven High School in New Haven, Michigan and was a student and a letterman in football. In football, after his junior and senior seasons, he won All-Southern Thumb Association honors and All-County honors. Eric Fowler graduated from New Haven High School in 2002.

Professional career

Pittsburgh Steelers
After being undrafted in the 2007 NFL Draft, Fowler signed with the Pittsburgh Steelers on May 9, 2007. He was released on August 27.

St. Louis Rams
Fowler was signed to the St. Louis Rams' practice squad on December 12, 2007. He was released on December 13, 2007.

Detroit Lions
Fowler signed with the Detroit Lions on July 27, 2008. He was waived on July 30. He re-signed to the practice squad on August 31. He was released on November 19 and re-signed again on November 24. He was signed to the active roster on December 29.

Fowler was waived/injured on August 25, 2009 and subsequently reverted to injured reserve. On November 4, 2009, Fowler was re-signed to the practice squad after the Lions released Taurus Johnson. Fowler was waived by the Lions on December 12 and added to the practice squad on December 15. He was promoted to the active roster again on December 24 when the team waived long snapper Nathan Hodel.

Fowler was released by the Lions on August 30, 2010.

External links
Detroit Lions bio
Grand Valley State Lakers bio
Pittsburgh Steelers bio

1984 births
Living people
People from Macomb County, Michigan
Sportspeople from Metro Detroit
Players of American football from Michigan
American football wide receivers
Grand Valley State Lakers football players
Pittsburgh Steelers players
St. Louis Rams players
Detroit Lions players